Ulaş is a village in Tarsus district of Mersin Province, Turkey. At  it is situated on the lower slopes of the Toros Mountains and on the road connecting Tarsus to Çamlıyayla. The population of Ulaş is  1457  as of 2011. According to Ulaş school page the village was founded as the winter settlement of the Turkmen nomads after 1375. The main economic sector of the village is viticulture. Olives and various fruits are also produced. There is also an olive press in the village.

References

Villages in Tarsus District